The 2021 CAF Champions League Final was the final match of the 2020–21 CAF Champions League, the 57th season of Africa's premier club football tournament organised by CAF, and the 25th edition under the current CAF Champions League title. It was played at the Stade Mohammed V in Casablanca, Morocco on 17 July 2021.

Al Ahly defeated Kaizer Chiefs 3–0 to win a record-extending 10th CAF Champions League title.
They also earned the right to play against Raja Casablanca, the winners of the 2020–21 CAF Confederation Cup, in the 2021–22 CAF Super Cup. Al Ahly also qualified for the 2021 FIFA Club World Cup in United Arab Emirates, entering from the second round.

Teams
In the following table, finals until 1996 were in the African Cup of Champions Club era, since 1997 were in the CAF Champions League era.

Venue

For the second consecutive year, the final was played as a single match at a pre-selected venue by CAF instead of a two-legged fixtures format, which was being used in the competition since 1966.

On 16 May 2021, Stade Mohammed V in Casablanca, Morocco was chosen by a CAF Executive Committee to host the final during a meeting in Kigali, Rwanda.

Road to the final

Note: In all results below, the score of the finalist is given first (H: home; A: away).

Format
The final was played as a single match at a pre-selected venue, with the winner of semi-final 1 according to the knockout stage draw designated as the "home" team for administrative purposes. If scores were level after full time, extra time would not to be played and the winner would be decided by a penalty shoot-out (Regulations Article III. 28).

Match

Details

Statistics

See also
2021 CAF Confederation Cup Final
2021–22 CAF Super Cup

Notes

References

External links
CAFonline.com

2021
Final
July 2021 sports events in Africa
Sport in Casablanca
International club association football competitions hosted by Morocco
Al Ahly SC matches
Kaizer Chiefs F.C. matches